The 1991 Bracknell Forest Borough Council election took place on 2 May 1991, to elect all 40 members in 19 wards for Bracknell Forest Borough Council in England. The election was held on the same day as other local elections as part of the 1991 United Kingdom local elections.  For the first time since 1979, opposition parties re-entered the council at an all-out council election, but the Conservative Party still managed to secure a landslide victory.

Ward results
An asterisk (*) denotes an incumbent councillor standing for re-election.

Votes for the Liberal Democrats are compared against the SDP–Liberal Alliance in 1987.

Ascot

Binfield

Bullbrook

College Town

Cranbourne

Crowthorne

Garth

Great Hollands North

Great Hollands South

Hanworth

Harmanswater

Little Sandhurst

Old Bracknell

Owlsmoor

Priestwood

Sandhurst

St. Marys

Warfield

Wildridings

Footnotes

References

Bracknell
Bracknell Forest Borough Council elections